The Colombian horned frog or Venezuelan horned frog (Ceratophrys calcarata) is a species of frog in the family Ceratophryidae.
It is found in Colombia and Venezuela.
Its natural habitats are dry savanna, subtropical or tropical dry shrubland, subtropical or tropical dry lowland grassland, and intermittent freshwater marshes.

References

Ceratophrys
Amphibians of Colombia
Amphibians of Venezuela
Amphibians described in 1890
Taxonomy articles created by Polbot